The following outline is provided as an overview of and topical guide to psychiatry:

Psychiatry – medical specialty devoted to the study and treatment of mental disorders. These mental disorders include various affective, behavioural, cognitive, and perceptual abnormalities.

What type of thing is psychiatry? 

 Academic discipline – field of study with academic departments, curricula and degrees; national and international societies; and specialized journals.
 Scientific field (a branch of science) – widely recognized category of specialized expertise within science, and typically embodies its own terminology and nomenclature. Such a field will usually be represented by one or more scientific journals, where peer-reviewed research is published.
 A natural science – field that seeks to elucidate the rules that govern the natural world using empirical and scientific methods.
 A biological science – a branch of biology, which is concerned with the study of life and living organisms, including their structure, function, growth, origin, evolution, distribution, and taxonomy.
 A medical specialty – branch of medical science. After completing medical school, physicians or surgeons usually further their medical education in a specific specialty of medicine by completing a multiple year residency to become a medical specialist.

Branches of psychiatry

Subspecialties of psychiatry 
Addiction psychiatry – focuses on evaluation and treatment of individuals with alcohol, drug, or other substance-related disorders, and of individuals with dual diagnosis of substance-related and other psychiatric disorders.
Child and adolescent psychiatry – branch of psychiatry that specialises in work with children, teenagers, and their families.
Cross-cultural psychiatry – branch of psychiatry concerned with the cultural and ethnic context of mental disorder and psychiatric services.
Emergency psychiatry – clinical application of psychiatry in emergency settings.
Forensic psychiatry – interface between law and psychiatry.
Geriatric psychiatry – branch of psychiatry dealing with the study, prevention, and treatment of mental disorders in humans with old age.
Liaison psychiatry – branch of psychiatry that specializes in the interface between other medical specialties and psychiatry.
Military psychiatry – covers special aspects of psychiatry and mental disorders within the military context.
Neuropsychiatry – branch of medicine dealing with mental disorders attributable to diseases of the nervous system.
Social psychiatry – branch of psychiatry that focuses on the interpersonal and cultural context of mental disorder and mental wellbeing.

Approaches of psychiatry 
Biological psychiatry – approach to psychiatry that aims to understand mental disorders in terms of the biological function of the nervous system.
Community psychiatry – approach that reflects an inclusive public health perspective and is practiced in community mental health services.
Global Mental Health – area of study, research and practice that places a priority on improving mental health and achieving equity in mental health for all people worldwide.

History of psychiatry 

 History of psychiatry

General psychiatry concepts 

 Glossary of psychiatry
 Mental disorder
Classification of mental disorders
History of mental disorder
 Mental Health

Psychiatric practice and standards

Doctor-patient relationship
 Therapeutic relationship

Nosological system
 Diagnostic and statistical manual of mental disorders
 International Statistical Classification of Diseases and Related Health Problems

Psychiatric diagnoses 
 ADHD
 Bipolar disorder
 Mania
 Schizophrenia
 History of schizophrenia
 Dementia praecox

Instruments
 Mental status examination

Diagnostic practices
 Rosenhan experiment

Psychiatric treatment
 Treatment of mental disorders

Chemical treatment
 Anxiolytics
 Barbiturates
 Antidepressants
 SSRI
 Antipsychotic
 Chemical imbalance theory
 Mood stabilizers
 Psychiatric medication
 List of psychiatric medications
 List of psychiatric medications by condition treated

Physical treatment

Electroconvulsive therapy

 Electroconvulsive therapy
 History of electroconvulsive therapy in the United Kingdom

Insulin coma therapy

 Insulin shock therapy (defunct)

Psychosurgery
 Psychosurgery
 Lobotomy (defunct)
Lobotomy instruments
Leucotome
Orbitoclast
Lobotomy patients
 Howard Dully

Fever therapy
 Pyrotherapy (defunct)

Psychological treatment
 Psychotherapy
 List of psychotherapies

Legal frameworks of psychiatric treatment 
 Diminished responsibility
 Forensic Psychiatry
 Informed consent
 Insanity
 Insanity defence
 Involuntary commitment
 Involuntary treatment
 Irresistible impulse
 M'Naghten Rules
 Macdonald triad
 Mens rea
 Mental health law
 Obligatory Dangerousness Criterion
 Outpatient commitment
 Psychiatric advance directive
 Sanity
 Therapeutic jurisprudence
 Ulysses pact
 Voluntary commitment

Australia
 Justices examination order
 Mental Health Review Tribunal of New South Wales

Ireland
1814-1922
 Criminal Lunatics (Ireland) Act 1838
From 1922–present
 Mental Health Act 2001

Italy
 Basaglia Law
 Law 180

U.K.
 Care in the Community
 Criminal Lunatics Act 1800
 Idiots Act 1886
 Fixated Threat Assessment Centre
 Lunacy Act 1845
 Lunacy (Vacating of Seats) Act 1886
 Madhouses Act 1774
 Place of safety

England and Wales
Approved Mental Health Professional
Diminished responsibility in English law
Mental Capacity Act 2005
Mental Health Act 1983
Mental Health Act 2007
Mental Health Review Tribunal (England and Wales)
Mental Treatment Act 1930
 Nearest relative

Scotland
 Adults with Incapacity (Scotland) Act 2000
 Forensic Network
 Mental Health (Care and Treatment) (Scotland) Act 2003
 Mental Health (Public Safety and Appeals) (Scotland) Act 1999

U.S.A.
 Adjudicative competence
 Civil confinement
 Civil Rights of Institutionalized Persons Act
 Competence (law)
 Duty to protect
 Duty to warn
 Forensic Mental Health Association of California
 List of criminal competencies
 Mental health courts
 PsychRights
 Ultimate issue (law)
 Californian mental health law
 5150 (Involuntary psychiatric hold)
 Florida mental health law
 Florida Mental Health Act: the Baker Act

Politics of psychiatry

Political movements 
 Psychiatric survivors movement

Anti-psychiatry movement
 Anti-psychiatry

People in the anti-psychiatry movement
 Franco Basaglia
 David Cooper (psychiatrist)
 Michel Foucault
 R.D. Laing
 Loren Mosher
 Thomas Szasz

Anti-psychiatry publications
 Against Therapy
 Anti-Oedipus
 Liberation by Oppression: A Comparative Study of Slavery and Psychiatry
 Madness and Civilization

Anti-psychiatry organisations
 American Association for the Abolition of Involuntary Mental Hospitalization

Psychiatric Institutions

General

 Asylums (book)
 Psychiatric hospital
 History of psychiatric institutions
 Deinstitutionalization
 Psychiatric reform in Italy
 Titicut Follies

Australian psychiatric institutions

 List of Australian psychiatric institutions

Psychiatric organizations 
 American Board of Psychiatry and Neurology
 American Psychiatric Association
 American Neuropsychiatric Association
 Brazilian Association of Psychiatry
 Canadian Psychiatric Association
 Chinese Society of Psychiatry
 Democratic Psychiatry
 German Society of Psychiatry, Psychotherapy and Neurology
 Hong Kong College of Psychiatrists
 Independent Psychiatric Association of Russia
 Indian Psychiatric Society
 Irish College of Psychiatrists
 Israeli Psychiatric Association
 Italian Psychiatric Society
 Japanese Society of Psychiatry & Neurology
 Korean Neuropsychiatric Association
 Maryland Psychiatric Society
 National Institute of Mental Health
 Pakistan Psychiatric Society
 Royal Australian and New Zealand College of Psychiatrists
 Royal College of Psychiatrists
 Singapore Psychiatric Association
 South African Society of Psychiatrists
 World Psychiatric Association

Psychiatry publications

Persons influential in psychiatry

Psychiatrists

 List of psychiatrists

Academic psychiatrists by country

 Ireland
Patricia Casey
Anthony Clare

See also 

 Outline of medicine
 Outline of the psychiatric survivors movement
 Behavioral medicine
 Biopsychiatry controversy
 Clinical neuroscience
 Imaging genetics
 Neuroimaging
 Neurophysiology
 Psychiatrist
 Psychiatric epidemiology
 Psychiatric genetics
 Psychiatric survivors movement
 Psychosomatic medicine
 Psycho-oncology
 Psychopharmacology
 Psychosurgery
 Psychoanalysis

 Lists

 Outline of the psychiatric survivors movement
 List of psychiatrists
 List of neurological disorders
 List of counseling topics
 List of psychotherapies
 List of psychiatric medications
 List of psychiatric medications by condition treated

References

External links 

Psychiatry
Psychiatry
 1